Eric Duft is an American basketball coach who is the current head coach of the Weber State Wildcats men's basketball team.

Playing career
After playing at Sterling High School in Kansas, Duft would continue his college playing career at local Sterling College, where he played four seasons of basketball.

Coaching career
Duft's first coaching position came at Central Community College in Kansas as an assistant coach for two seasons, before spending a lone season as the team's head coach. He'd then move on to an assistant coaching position at Cowley Community College, before spending the next seven seasons as an assistant coach at Hutchinson Community College, where he worked under former Utah State head coach Tim Duryea.

In 2006, he was hired as an assistant coach under Randy Rahe at Weber State, and remained on staff through Rahe's entire coaching tenure, which included three NCAA tournament appearances and five Big Sky Conference regular season titles. After Rahe announced his retirement on May 17, 2022, Duft was promoted to head coach two days later, making him the 10th head coach in Weber State basketball history.

Head coaching record

NCAA D1

References

Living people
American men's basketball coaches
Weber State Wildcats men's basketball coaches
Hutchinson Blue Dragons men's basketball coaches
Junior college men's basketball coaches in the United States
Sterling Warriors men's basketball players
People from Sterling, Kansas
Basketball coaches from Kansas
Year of birth missing (living people)